Ygor Maciel Santiago (born 1 June 1984), commonly known as Ygor, is a Brazilian footballer who plays as a midfielder.

Career
Born in Santana do Livramento, Ygor started his career with Vasco da Gama. In February 2007, he was transferred to Start of Norway for about €1 million. He signed a four-year contract with the club and made his league debut on 9 April 2007 against Aalesund. He scored his first goal for the club six days later in a 1–1 draw against Viking, which was the opening game of Start's new stadium Sør Arena. Ygor featured in all of Start's league games in the 2007 season. Following the club's relegation from the Norwegian Premier League in 2007, he was loaned out to Fluminense for the 2008 season in Brazil. After a year in Fluminense, he went on loan to Portuguesa, and stayed at Lusa for one year. His contract with Start was terminated in March 2010. After this, Ygor signed with Figueirense.

Honours
Internacional
Campeonato Gaúcho: 2013, 2014

Goiás
Campeonato Goiano: 2015

References

1984 births
Living people
People from Santana do Livramento
Brazilian footballers
Brazilian expatriate footballers
CR Vasco da Gama players
Associação Portuguesa de Desportos players
Fluminense FC players
Expatriate footballers in Norway
Brazilian expatriate sportspeople in Norway
IK Start players
Eliteserien players
Figueirense FC players
Sport Club Internacional players
Goiás Esporte Clube players
Clube Náutico Capibaribe players
Campeonato Brasileiro Série A players
Al Salmiya SC players
Association football midfielders
Kuwait Premier League players
Expatriate footballers in Kuwait
Brazilian expatriate sportspeople in Kuwait
Sportspeople from Rio Grande do Sul